The World's Billionaires 2013 edition was 27th annual ranking of The World's Billionaires by Forbes magazine.  The list estimated the net worth of the world's richest people, excluding royalty and dictators, as of February 14, 2013.  It was released online on March 3, 2013 and published in the March 25 print edition of Forbes.

Annual list
Mexico's Carlos Slim topped the 2013 billionaire list, marking his fourth consecutive year at the top.  Microsoft founder Bill Gates remained in second, while Zara founder Amancio Ortega moved up to third.  Oretega's gain of $19.5 billion was the largest of anyone on the list.  American investor Warren Buffett failed to make the top three for the first time since 2000, placing fourth.  Oracle founder Larry Ellison rounded out the top five.  Diesel founder Renzo Rosso was among the top newcomers, debuting with an estimate net worth of $3 billion.

A global rise in asset prices, led Forbes editor Randall Lane to declare "It [was] a very good year to be a billionaire".  However, it was not a good year to be Mark Zuckerberg.  The founder of Facebook saw his fortune fall by $4 billion to $13.3 billion, but he wasn't the biggest loser.  That was Brazil's Eike Batista who fell from seventh to 100th.   Overall, net gainers outnumbered net losers by 4:1.

A record total of 1,426 people made the 2013 list, representing $5.4 trillion of assets.  Of those, 442 billionaires hailed from the United States.  The Asian-Pacific region had 386 billionaires and Europe 366.  The list also featured a record number of newcomers, 210, representing 42 different countries.  The United States had the most newcomers with 27.  Sixty people from the 2012 list fell below a billion dollar of assets in 2013 and eight others from the 2012 list died.  The Asia-Pacific region had the most drop offs, with 29, followed by the United States with 16.  The 2013 list featured 138 women, of which 50 came from the United States.

A majority of the list (961 individuals, 67%) was entirely self-made; 184 (13%) inherited their wealth, and 281 (20%) achieved their fortune through a combination of inheritance and business acumen.  Two billionaires – Sulaiman Al Rajhi and Roman Avdeev - tied for the most children with 23.  Both of their fortunes are tied to the banking industry, Al-Rajhi Bank and Credit Bank of Moscow respectively.

Top 10

Top 100

See also
 List of wealthiest families

References

External links
Inside The 2013 Billionaires List: Facts and Figures (Forbes)

Forbes lists
Lists of people by magazine appearance
2013 in economics